David Abashidze Stadium is a multi-use stadium in Zestafoni, Georgia. It is used mostly for football matches and is the home stadium of FC Zestafoni. The stadium is able to hold 4,100 people and opened in 1952.
Zestafoni David Abashidze Stadium (former Central Stadium) was built by the Zestafoni Ferro-alloy Plant. A couple of matches were held on the stadium before its opening in 1951.
 
In 1952-1989 and 1999-2003 of Georgian Championship team FC Metallurg Zestafoni held matches on the Zestafoni central stadium, in 1990-1998 it was a home stadium for FC Margveti Zestafoni.

Since 2004, FC Zestafoni has held home matches in the stadium.

In 1981, reconstruction work was done on the arena; the west stand was roofed and the east stand was constructed. After these works capacity of the stadium increased to 8000 seats.

In 2004, after establishing FC Zestafoni, central stadium was repaired and is still being repaired to renew the arena and comply with international standards.
 
In 2005, works were done to renew the grass surface on the stadium. Georgian workers have constructed new drainage system of German technology. The field is watered with a watering system fromf an American Company “Rainbird”. (This watering system was successfully used on eight stadiums during the 2004 European Championship in Portugal.)

On the Zestafoni central stadium, the field surface, “Natural Green Carpet”, was made by the Ukrainian firm “Lidia-Park”.
 
FC Zestafoni management plans to build a new base for the club. Some new football fields have been constructed in Zestafoni (among them one with an artificial surface). Relevant infrastructure is being made – work out rooms are being repaired, building of new tribunes with personal seats is planned, along with the installment of a modern score-board.

On 9 April 2010 the Stadium was named after David Abashidze who contributed tremendously to the development and revival of football in Zestafoni.

Capacity of the stadium has been increased to 4 558 individual seats.

See also 
 Stadiums in Georgia

Sports venues completed in 1952
Sports venues built in the Soviet Union
Sports venues in Georgia (country)
Football venues in Georgia (country)
Buildings and structures in Imereti